Zygmunt Chmielewski (16 May 1894 – 26 May 1978) was a Polish film actor. He appeared in 35 films between 1921 and 1960.

Selected filmography
 His Excellency, The Shop Assistant (1933)
 Czy Lucyna to dziewczyna ? (1934)
 Córka generała Pankratowa (1934)
 Barbara Radziwiłłówna (1936)
 Pan Twardowski (1936)
 Trędowata (1936)
 Wierna rzeka (1936)
 Ordynat Michorowski (1937)
 Nikodem Dyzma (1956)
 Kapelusz pana Anatola (1957)
 Inspekcja pana Anatola (1959)

References

External links

1894 births
1978 deaths
Polish male film actors
Polish male silent film actors
Polish male stage actors
Recipients of the Order of Polonia Restituta
Actors from Odesa
20th-century Polish male actors